Yuu or YUU may refer to:
 Yū, Yamaguchi, or Yuu, a town in Kuga District, Yamaguchi Prefecture, Japan
 Yuu (wrestler), Japanese professional wrestler
 Yuu Shiina, usually written You Shiina, Japanese illustrator and manga artist

See also
 You (disambiguation)